Woolper Creek is a stream in Boone County, Kentucky, United States. It is a tributary of the Ohio River.

Woolper Creek has the name of John David Woolpert, a pioneer citizen.

See also
List of rivers of Kentucky

References

Rivers of Boone County, Kentucky
Rivers of Kentucky